Nenad Beđik (born 14 April 1989 in Subotica, SR Serbia, Yugoslavia) is a Serbian rower. He won 6th place in double sculls at the 2007 Junior World Championship. He represented Serbia at the 2012 Summer Olympics, with Nikola Stojic, and the 2016 Summer Olympics, with Milos Vasic.

At World level, he won bronze at the 2015 World Championships with Vasic.

At European level he has won gold in 2013, with Stojic, and bronze in 2012 (with Stojic) and 2015 and 2017 (with Vasic).

He took up rowing at the age of 13 after a rowing coach came to his school and had him try an ergometer. He is a member of Rowing Club Partizan.

References

External links
 
 Serbian rowing federation 
 
 

1989 births
Living people
Serbian male rowers
Sportspeople from Subotica
Olympic rowers of Serbia
Rowers at the 2012 Summer Olympics
Rowers at the 2016 Summer Olympics
World Rowing Championships medalists for Serbia
European champions for Serbia
Mediterranean Games silver medalists for Serbia
Competitors at the 2013 Mediterranean Games
Mediterranean Games medalists in rowing
European Rowing Championships medalists